The Dashmesh Regiment was a militant group, and is part of the Khalistan movement to create a Sikh homeland called Khalistan via armed struggle.
The Dashmesh Regiment jathebandi group has claimed responsibility for two of the killings in the 2016–17 Targeted killings in Punjab, India.
Dashmesh Regiments leadership was destroyed during Operation Vadhi Pahar in 1991 Punjab,India and is referred to as balowali encounter where hundreds of combined troops of BSF,CRPF,PP and Indian army were deployed in the farm fields of Bolowali village. During this fierce encounter that took place for 3 days,many Indian security forces were KIA ( killed in action) and 5 dashmesh regiment militants KIA (killed in action) it is numbered that there 12000 troops deployed but some sources say that only 1200 troops were around Bolowali village and the rest were deployed when militants from BTFK ( bhindranwalas tiger force of khalistan) came to aid Seetal Singh( KIA) but these claims might be debated.
It is unclear if the dashmesh regiment was behind the 2016–17 Targeted killings in Punjab, India since the media created a vague email address and no proof was given by the media that dashmesh regiment was behind the killings and some sources say that it was khalistan liberation force since the fact that dashmesh regiment was destroyed during operation Vadhi Pahar and no current leadership of dashmesh regiment is known.

See also
Kharku
History of the Punjab
Operation Blue Star
Terrorism in India
Sikh extremism
Insurgency in Punjab

References

Paramilitary organisations based in India
Terrorism in India
Pro-Khalistan militant outfits
Sikh terrorism
Designated terrorist organizations associated with Sikhism
Insurgency in Punjab